Cheyenne Campbell (born 10 September 1986) is a female rugby union player for . She was a member of the squad to the 2010 Women's Rugby World Cup that finished in third place.

She has been named in 's 2014 Women's Rugby World Cup squad.

Campbell is a cousin of Wallabies flyhalf Quade Cooper. She currently works as a PE teacher at Shailer Park State High.

References

External links
Wallaroos Profile

1986 births
Living people
Australia women's international rugby union players
Australian female rugby union players
Rugby union centres